Hicham Mesbahi (born December 4, 1980) is a boxer from Morocco who participated in three Olympics. He was born in Casablanca.

In 2000, when Sydney hosted the Summer Olympics, he fell in the second round. At the 2004 Summer Olympics where he fought for his native North African country he was defeated in the second round of the flyweight (51 kg) division by Poland's Andrzej Rzany. He qualified for the Athens Games by winning the gold medal at the 1st AIBA African 2004 Olympic Qualifying Tournament in Casablanca, Morocco. In the final of the event he defeated Algeria's Mebarek Soltani.

For the 2008 Summer Olympics Mesbahi qualified at bantamweight beating among others Issa Samir even though he lost the final of the qualifier to Abdelhalim Ouradi.

References

1980 births
Sportspeople from Casablanca
Flyweight boxers
Olympic boxers of Morocco
Living people
Boxers at the 2000 Summer Olympics
Boxers at the 2004 Summer Olympics
Boxers at the 2008 Summer Olympics
Moroccan male boxers
20th-century Moroccan people
21st-century Moroccan people